Cayo District is a district located in the west part of Belize. It is the most extensive, second-most populous and third-most densely populated of the six districts of Belize. The district's capital is the town of San Ignacio.

Geography 
Being the largest district, it borders Guatemala to the west, Orange Walk district to the north, Belize district to the northeast, Stann Creek district to the southeast and Toledo district to the south. The nation's capital, Belmopan, is located within the district.

Other important towns and cities in the district include Benque Viejo del Carmen, twin towns of San Ignacio and Santa Elena (District's Capital), Seven Miles (El Progreso), San Antonio, Valley of Peace, St. Margaret, Roaring Creek, Armenia, San Jose Succotz, Arenal, Buena Vista, Bullet Tree Falls, Calla Creek, Esperanza, Cristo Rey, Georgeville, Unitedville, Blackman Eddy, Ontario, Camalote, Los Tambos, More Tomorrow and Spanish Lookout.

Major rivers in the district include the Macal River and the Mopan River.

Economy and Infrastructure 

Cayo District is primarily an agricultural district, with the chief crops being citrus fruit (more specifically, oranges, grapefruit, and tangerine), as well as bananas. Recently, oil was found in Spanish Lookout and it is now in production.

There are two major highways in the District, the George Price Highway, that runs from Belize City to the Guatemalan border, and the Hummingbird Highway which starts in Belmopan and ends at the juncture of the Coastal Road and the Southern Highway that ends in the Stann Creek District. In addition to the ruins listed above there are several other important nature reserves including two National Parks, Blue Hole and Guanacaste National Park. Ecotourism is also an integral part of the region's economy.

Political divisions 
Politically, Cayo is divided into six constituencies, described in detail here:

 Belmopan: Current representative John Saldivar (UDP)
 Cayo Central: Current representative Rene Montero (UDP)
 Cayo North: Current representative Omar Figueroa (UDP)
 Cayo North East: Current representative Orlando Habet (PUP)
 Cayo South: Current representative Julius Espat (PUP)
 Cayo West: Current representative Erwin Contreras (UDP)

Archaeological sites
Cayo District contains several pre-Columbian mayan ruins and sites, among these are Caracol, Xunantunich, Cahal Pech, Baking Pot, Lower Dover and El Pilar.

Demographics

According to the 2010 Population and Housing Census, Cayo District's total population is of 73,202 residents (compared to the district's 2000 population of 53,715); of whom 36,803 are males and 36,399 are females. The total number of households is 15,497 and the average household size is 4.7.

The southern half of Cayo District is very low densely populated. A large majority of the district's population lives north of the 17th parallel.

Rural and urban development
In 2010, the total population of Cayo's urban areas was of 36,455; 17,939 males and 18,516 females. 7,468 total households and a 4.9 average household size. The total population of Cayo's rural areas was of 36,747; 18,864 males and 17,883 females. 8,029 total households and a 4.6 average household size.

References

External links
 Map
 Cayo South
 GoToCayoBelize.com
 Best of Cayo

 
Districts of Belize